Microlipophrys velifer, the sailfin blenny  is a species of combtooth blenny found in the eastern Atlantic ocean off west Africa from Mauritania and Cape Verde to the Cunene River, Angola.

Description
This species grows to a length of  TL. The dorsal fin has 12 spines and 15 to 16 rays while the anal fin has two spines and 16 to 18 rays. The species inhabits rocky intertidal zones both protected and unprotected from the waves. The species lay eggs that are attached in holes in rocks.

References

Further reading

 Bath, H., 1990. "Blenniidae". p. 905-915. in J.C. Quero, J.C. Hureau, C. Karrer, A. Post and L. Saldanha (eds.) Check-list of the fishes of the eastern tropical Atlantic (CLOFETA). JNICT, Lisbon; SEI, Paris; and UNESCO, Paris. Vol.2.
 Nelson, J.: Fishes of the World, 3rd ed.. New York, USA: John Wiley and Sons., 1994, p. 600

velifer
Marine fauna of West Africa
Fish of Angola
Fauna of Cameroon
Vertebrates of Cape Verde
Fish of Equatorial Guinea
Fish of the East Atlantic
Fish described in 1935
Taxa named by John Roxborough Norman